Anja Weisser (also spelled Weißer; born 2 October 1991 in Marktoberdorf, Germany) is a German ice hockey defender.

International career
Weisser was selected for the Germany women's national ice hockey team in the 2014 Winter Olympics. She had one assists.

As of 2014, Weisser has also appeared for Germany at two IIHF Women's World Championships. Her first appearance came in 2011.

Weisser made two appearances for the Germany women's national under-18 ice hockey team, at the IIHF World Women's U18 Championships, with the first in 2008.

Career statistics

International career
Through 2013–14 season

References

External links
 
 
 
 

1988 births
People from Marktoberdorf
Sportspeople from Swabia (Bavaria)
Living people
Olympic ice hockey players of Germany
Ice hockey players at the 2014 Winter Olympics
German women's ice hockey defencemen